John Richard Smith may refer to:
 John Richard Smith (footballer, born 1898) (1898–1986), English footballer
 John Smith (footballer, born 1971), English footballer

See also
 John R. Smith (disambiguation)
 John Smith (disambiguation)